Rubin bin Balang is a Malaysian politician who is serving as the member of Sabah State Legislative Assembly (MLA) for Kemabong since September 2020. He is a member of the Parti Gagasan Rakyat Sabah (GAGASAN) which is a component party of the ruling Gabungan Rakyat Sabah (GRS) coalition both in federal and state levels.

Election results

Honours 
 :
  Commander of the Order of Kinabalu (PGDK) – Datuk  (1996)

References

Members of the Sabah State Legislative Assembly
Living people
Year of birth missing (living people)
Commanders of the Order of Kinabalu
Malaysian United Indigenous Party politicians
Former United Malays National Organisation politicians